The English School may refer to:

Schools

 English School attached to Guangdong University of Foreign Studies, a school in Guangzhou, China
 The English School (Colegio de Inglaterra), a school in Bogotá, Colombia
 The English School, Nicosia, a school in Nicosia, Cyprus
 The English School of Kyrenia, a school in Northern Cyprus
 English School (Helsinki), a school in Helsinki, Finland
 English School Fahaheel Kuwait, a school in Mangaf, Kuwait
 SMK Sultan Yussuf, formerly the Batu Gajah Government English School, in Perak, Malaysia
 Internationella Engelska Skolan, a group of schools in Sweden

Other
 English school of international relations theory

See also
 English College, Rome, a Catholic seminary in Rome, Italy